Peptoniphilus lacydonensis is a Gram-positive, anaerobic and microaerophilic bacterium from the genus of Peptoniphilus which has been isolated from a patient with chronic refractory sinusitis.

References 

Bacteria described in 2018
Eubacteriales